Almah is a Brazilian heavy metal band. Initially established in 2006 as a side project of former Angra singer Edu Falaschi, the band has released five albums and has turned from a solo-project into a band with regular activities. Almah plays internationally since 2008 and was featured in festivals such as Rock in Rio (2013) and ProgPower USA (2015), among others.

Band name
Edu Falaschi stated that he was looking for a band name that was easy to remember and pronounce in all languages. In Portuguese and Spanish, Alma means "soul". He discovered that in Hebrew, Almah (עלמה), with  an "h", means virgin and purity. He also stated that many religious people say what it means is the opposite. "I decided to talk about human feelings in a whole album - and human feelings can be good and bad – like liberty like love ore we can feel like freedom we can feel envy and greed – bad feelings. That's how I decided to write about human feelings.

Biography
The band's first album, Almah, was released in the second half of 2006. Besides singing, Edu Falaschi also produced the record, composed all the songs and wrote all the lyrics. The album was recorded in Finland and Brazil with musicians such as Emppu Vuorinen (guitars – Nightwish), Lauri Porra (bass – Stratovarius) and Casey Grillo (drums – Kamelot), and special guest appearances of Mike Stone (guitars – Queensrÿche), Edu Ardanuy (guitars – Dr. Sin) and Sizão Machado (bass – Tom Jobim, Chico Buarque and others), among others. The album received good reviews in rock magazines and websites worldwide. Falaschi was called one of the best singers by Burrn! magazine readers (Japan).

In June 2007, Angra took a break for two years and Falaschi concentrated on his work with Almah. The solo project turned into a band with a stable line-up.

Falaschi: Angra really stopped in 2007 in July. And then when I released the first album, it was the solo album, I knew that maybe in the future Almah could be a band. And when Angra really stopped, we didn’t know about Angra future and we didn’t know when we would come back with Angra. I decided in December 2007 to create a new Almah album, but as a real band, as a full time band.

Almah's second album, Fragile Equality, was released in October 2008. Besides Falaschi, who is handling the vocals, his Angra's band mate Felipe Andreoli on bass has participated in the band. Guitar player Marcelo Barbosa from Khallice joined the band before its first tour in August 2007. During pre-production stage of Fragile Equality, drummer Marcelo Moreira and second guitarist Paulo Schroeber joined Almah. All members have contributed actively to the songwriting process of Fragile Equality, with Falaschi and Andreoli being responsible for the production as well. The album was at Norcal Studios in 2008. Fragile Equality's lyrical concept is about "the balance between all the elements of the universe" based on a book that Edu is the co-writer for. The book "Fragile Equality - Equinox-Book 1" (done in manga style) is to be released sometime later, with a karaoke CD of the Fragile Equality album.

In Brazil, the first pressing of the album was sold out during the first day of official sales. According to the magazine Roadie Crew the album became of the best-selling albums in Brazil. By the readers of Brazilian metal magazine, Roadie Crew and by the contributors of the Brazilian metal website Whiplash, and the Brazilian metal website Rock Underground Almah and Fragile Equality were recognized as the Best Brazilian Band 2008, the Best Album 2008, The Best Artwork 2008 among other nominations awarded to Almah musicians. The album was also well reviewed internationally.

A tour started in São Paulo in November 2008 and finished in April 2009 in Rio de Janeiro. In July and August 2008, Almah played on the main stage of musical festivals Píaui Pop and Porão Do Rock.

In January 2009, Almah launched the new video clip "Beyond Tomorrow". It was filmed in December 2008 in Brasília by Rodrigo Gianetto who works also for MTV Brazil. In March 2009, the band released its first digital single, an acoustic version of "All I Am", through its Brazilian Equality Fan Club.

Angra returned to activities in March 2009 but Almah announced the start of composing songs for the follow-up of Fragile Equality.

In September 2011, Edu Falaschi and Felipe Andreoli went to Japan to promote the album release by making various interviews for the local press. In October 2011, Paulo Schroeber left the band due to health issues. He had played his last show with the band in July 2011. The band also played a few concerts with Sepultura in late 2011.

In April 2012, the band played at the Metal Open Air festival in São Luís. This was the first concert of the new guitarist Gustavo Di Padua who replaced Paulo Schroeber. In May 2012, Andreoli announced his departure from Almah to fully dedicate himself to other projects and his main band, Angra. On the same day, Edu Falaschi announced his departure from Angra on an open letter, to focus on his work with Almah.

Falaschi said in September 2013 that he had 20 new songs for an upcoming Almah album. The band has since released Unfold (2013), their fourth album, as well as a compilation, Within the Last Eleven Lines, in 2015.

Band members 
Current members
 Edu Falaschi – vocals, keyboards, acoustic guitar (2006–present)
 Marcelo Barbosa – guitars, acoustic guitar (2007–present)
 Raphael Dafras – bass (2012–present)
 Diogo Mafra - guitars (2014–present)
 Pedro Tinello - drums (2015–present)

Former members
 Emppu Vuorinen – guitars (2006–2007)
 Lauri Porra – bass (2006–2007)
 Casey Grillo – drums (2006–2007)
 Felipe Andreoli – bass (2007–2012)
 Paulo Schroeber – guitars (2008–2011)
 Gustavo Di Padua – guitars (2011–2013)
 Marcelo Moreira – drums (2008–2015)

Touring musicians
 Ian Bemolator – guitars (2011; 2013-2014)

Guest musicians
 Mike Stone – guitars
 Edu Ardanuy – guitars
 Rafael Bittencourt – guitars
 Demian Tiguez – guitars
 Tito Falaschi – bass
 Aquiles Priester – drums
 Fábio Laguna – keyboards

Timeline

Discography
 Almah (2006/2007, JVC/Laser/AFM) No. 165 Japanese charts
 Fragile Equality (2008, JVC/Laser/AFM) No. 188 Japanese Charts
 "You Take My Hand" (2008, Equality Fan Club) [single]
 "All I Am" (2009, Equality Fan Club) [single]
 Motion (2011)
 Unfold (2013)
 Within the Last Eleven Lines (2015) [compilation]
 E.V.O (2016)

References

External links 

 

Brazilian power metal musical groups
Brazilian heavy metal musical groups
Musical groups from São Paulo
Musical groups established in 2006
2006 establishments in Brazil